Kule is a village in Botswana.

Kule may also refer to:
Kule, Łódź Voivodeship (central Poland)
Kule, Silesian Voivodeship (south Poland)
Kule, Sangameshwar a village in Maharashtra, India.
Kulê, a nickname for the Philippine Collegian student newspaper